Litke Nunatak is a nunatak  east of the Perov Nunataks, lying at the eastern margin of the Scott Mountains in Enderby Land, Antarctica. It was named by the Soviet Antarctic Expedition, 1961–62, after the Soviet icebreaker Litke.

References

Nunataks of Enderby Land